John E. Bacon (South Carolina politician) (1830–1897), South Carolina politician, diplomat
 John E. Bacon (Arizona politician) (1869–1964), Arizona politician, doctor